Qatar Academy (QA) is a group of private, co-educational schools in Qatar. The group is administered by Qatar Foundation. It is an IB World School that offers the PYP, MYP, and the IB Diploma.

There are currently five branches of the school operating in Qatar:
Qatar Academy Doha
Qatar Academy Msheireb
Qatar Academy Sidra
Qatar Academy Al Khor
Qatar Academy Al Wakrah

Alumni
Ahmed Mohamed

References

External links

 

International schools in Qatar
Schools in Qatar
Education City